North Ockendon is the easternmost and most outlying settlement of Greater London, England, and part of the London Borough of Havering. It was historically an ancient parish in the county of Essex, which was abolished for civil purposes in 1936. North Ockendon is the only area in Greater London outside the M25 London Orbital Motorway. North Ockendon is north of South Ockendon, in Thurrock, Essex.

History

North Ockendon ancient parish had an elongated east–west shape, thus contrasting with a series of perpendicular parishes to its north and west. With the adjoining parishes this formed a large estate that is at least middle-Saxon or, perhaps, even Roman or Bronze Age. The parish church, dedicated to Mary Magdalene, was built in the fourteenth century, on the site of an earlier church.

From 1894 until it was abolished in 1936, North Ockendon formed a parish in the Orsett Rural District of Essex. North Ockendon was still rural at the time of its inclusion in the Hornchurch Urban District, but it was anticipated suburban house building would soon encroach on the parish. The creation of the Metropolitan Green Belt meant the limit of London's urban sprawl stopped just short of the parish boundary, and North Ockendon remained rural.

In 1965, Hornchurch Urban District was abolished, and its former area, including North Ockendon, was transferred to Greater London and used to form the present-day London Borough of Havering. North Ockendon and Great Warley were to the east of the M25 motorway when it was constructed. In 1992, it was proposed that the part of Greater London to the east of the M25 should be transferred to Essex, with the Great Warley section north of the railway transferred to Brentwood and the North Ockendon section to the south transferred to Thurrock. The transfer of North Ockendon from London to Essex was strongly opposed, with Nicholas Bonsor MP stating that his constituents agreed it had "more affinity with Havering than with Thurrock". Following the review the Great Warley section was transferred to Essex, but the North Ockendon part was not, leaving it the only part of Greater London to be outside the M25 motorway.

North Ockendon is the location of Stubbers, a former stately home which was demolished in 1955, the grounds of which are now used as an activity centre.

Elizabeth Kucinich, wife of the U.S. congressman and presidential candidate, was born in North Ockendon in 1977.

Demography
North Ockendon lies within the Upminster ward. The 2011 census showed that the population was 96% white (92% British, 2% Other, 2% Irish). Indian, Chinese and Black African were 1% each.

Geography
To the east is a small area of fenland, which extends into Bulphan and the rest is clays and Thames alluvials. The land is very low lying. The field boundaries are wholly rectilinear. In the far north, beyond the London, Tilbury and Southend line, it borders the villages of Great Warley, Little Warley and Childerditch in the borough of Brentwood. The settlements of West Horndon and Bulphan are to the east, and South Ockendon, to the south, is in the borough and unitary authority of Thurrock. It is the only significant settlement in Greater London which lies outside the M25 motorway.

The Church of St Mary Magdalene, North Ockendon has a probably re-used Norman nave door on the south side of the nave. Its tower was used in the first accurate measurement of the speed of sound, by the Reverend William Derham, Rector of Upminster. Gunshots were fired from the tower and the flash thereof was observed by telescope from the tower of the church of St Laurence, Upminster; then the time was recorded until the sound arrived, from which, with an accurate distance measurement, the speed could be calculated.

Transport
The nearest railway stations are at Ockendon and Upminster.
London bus routes 347 and 370 directly link the area with Upminster and Romford, as well as Lakeside Shopping Centre (370 only), and Essex routes 269 and X81 link the area with Brentwood (both) as well as Grays (269) and Lakeside Shopping Centre (X81).

References

External links

Hidden London: North Ockendon

Areas of London
Districts of the London Borough of Havering
Villages in London
Former civil parishes in London